is a German-born Japanese organic farmer and a social activist. She is well known for her significant contributions to the organic farming in Japan. In 2017, she was honored at the United Nations Food and Agriculture Organization.

Life 
She was born in Germany and raised in Tokyo. Her parents were farmers who contributed to organic farming in rural areas. Her father was also a businessman in addition to farming.

Career 
She graduated from the Faculty of Environment and Information Studies in Keio University in 1998. She also graduated from the Technical University of Munich, Germany. Eri returned to Japan in 2013 after receiving a master's degree and became an organic farmer. She also currently serves as the President of NPO Rural Heroines Organization which is a Japanese national organization for the female farmers.

She also took steps in continuing the organic farming in Kumamoto Prefecture post the 2016 Kumamoto earthquake and launched several projects for the development of rural areas in Japan. She received the Model Farmer Award from the 2017 United Nations Food and Agriculture Organization.

References 

Living people
Japanese farmers
Japanese activists
Japanese social workers
Keio University alumni
Technical University of Munich alumni
Japanese expatriates in Germany
German expatriates in Japan
Year of birth missing (living people)
Organic farmers